The Grip is a live debut album by jazz saxophonist Arthur Blythe which was recorded at the Brook, New York City in 1977 and released on the India Navigation label. The album was released on CD as a compilation with Metamorphosis which was recorded at the same concert.

Reception
The Allmusic review by Eugene Chadbourne awarded the album 4 stars and states "Jazz listeners who want to get "lost in space" can consider this tasty slab of late-'70s indie jazz akin to a ticket on the Mars shuttle. Arthur Blythe and his associates on this record occupied one of the more spirited creative edges of the New York free jazz scene. The energy and determination with which the group plays is in itself an aspect that can make the sounds of other groups appear somewhat mummified".

Track listing
All compositions by Arthur Blythe except as indicated
 "The Grip" - 7:15 
 "Spirits in the Field" (Frank Lowe) - 8:36  
 "Sunrise Service" - 7:54  
 "Lower Nile" - 4:02  
 "As of Yet" - 12:37  
 "My Son Ra" - 3:22
Recorded at the Brook in New York City on February 26, 1977.

Personnel
Arthur Blythe - alto saxophone 
Abdul Wadud - cello
Ahmed Abdullah - trumpet  
Bob Stewart - tuba  
Steve Reid - drums 
Muhamad Abdullah - percussion

References

Arthur Blythe live albums
1977 live albums
India Navigation live albums